Saattoq (old spelling: Sâtoq) is a former settlement in Avannaata municipality in northwestern Greenland. It was located in the north-central part of Upernavik Archipelago, in Tasiusaq Bay, straddling Saattorsuaq Island, and the nearby Saattoq skerry.

History 
Saattoq was populated in 1881. It was a very small village of fewer than 10 people at any time. It was abandoned in 1957, during the post-war consolidation phase in northwestern Greenland, with the surviving population moving to nearby Nutaarmiut.

References 

Former populated places in Greenland
Tasiusaq Bay
Upernavik Archipelago